List of notable flamenco guitarists:

A
 Ramón de Algeciras
 Vicente Amigo
 Aniya la Gitana
 Juan d'Anyelica
 Gino D'Auri

B

 Tonino Baliardo
 Miguel de la Bastide
 Andrés Batista

C

 Juan Manuel Cañizares
 Agustín Carbonell
 Paco Cepero
 Chuscales
 Charo (María de Rasten)
 Moraíto Chico II
 Jesse Cook
 Juan Raphael Cortés

D
 Gino D'Auri
 Diego del Gastor

E
 El Viejín (José Jiménez)
 Mario Escudero

F
 Eddie Freeman

G
 Ricardo Garcia
 Diego del Gastor
 Feliu Gasull
 Juan Gómez "Chicuelo"
 Pedro Javier González
 Grisha Goryachev

H
 Pepe Habichuela
 Juan Habichuela (Juan Carmona)
 Amir-John Haddad
 Oscar Herrero

J
 Antonia Jiménez
 Niño Josele

K
 Robby Krieger
 Andrei Krylov

L

 Michael Laucke
 Javier Limón
 Paco de Lucena
 Ottmar Liebert
 Thomas Lorenzo
 Paco de Lucía

M

 Luis Maravilla
 Melchor de Marchena
 Juan Martín
 Pepe Martínez
 Robert Michaels
 Ricardo Modrego
 Carlos Montoya
 Ramón Montoya
 Diego Del Morao

P
 
 Paco Peña
 Manitas de Plata (Ricardo Baliardo)
 Donn Pohren

R

 Ronald Radford
 Val Ramos
 Antonio Rey
 Niño Ricardo
 Rafael Riqueni
 Flavio Rodrigues
 José Antonio Rodríguez
 Lawson Rollins
 Pepe Romero
 Mohamed Rouane
 Javier Ruibal

S

 Sabicas (Agustín Castellón Campos)
 Esteban de Sanlúcar
 Manolo Sanlúcar
 Roger Scannura
 Juan Serrano
 Paco Serrano
 Marta Soto
 Edward Stephenson

T

 Teye (Teije Wijnterp)
 Tomatito (José Fernández Torres)

Y
Narciso Yepes

See also
 List of classical guitarists

References

External links

 
Lists of guitarists